This is a list of notable sketch comedy groups by country.

Australia 
 Aunty Donna
 The Chaser
 The Janoskians

Belgium 
 Neveneffecten

Brazil 
 Casseta & Planeta
 Hermes & Renato
 Os Trapalhões
 Porta dos Fundos

Canada 
 The Bobroom
 CODCO
 The Frantics
 Hot Thespian Action
 The Kids in the Hall
 LoadingReadyRun
 The Minnesota Wrecking Crew
 Picnicface
 Red Green
 Rock et Belles Oreilles
 Royal Canadian Air Farce
 The Ryan and Amy Show
 The Sketchersons
 Three Dead Trolls in a Baggie
 Truthhorse
 Wayne and Shuster
 The Vacant Lot

Estonia 
 Kreisiraadio

Finland 
 Kummeli
 Studio Julmahuvi

France 
 Les Inconnus

India 
 All India Bakchod
 East India Comedy
 Jordindian

Republic of Ireland 
 Foil Arms and Hog

Portugal 
 Gato Fedorento

Japan 
 Downtown (Dauntaun in Katakana)

United Kingdom 
 Armstrong and Miller
 Cambridge Circus
 The Cambridge Footlights
 The Consultants
 Derek and Clive
 Hale and Pace
 The Hollow Men
 Idiots of Ants
 Monty Python
 Morecambe and Wise
 Pappy's
 Pete and Dud
 Mitchell and Webb
 Studio E
 The Mighty Boosh
 The Penny Dreadfuls

United States 
 Asperger's Are Us
 Barats and Bereta
 Derrick Comedy
 Duck's Breath Mystery Theatre
 The Firesign Theatre
 The Groundlings
 Harvard Sailing Team
 Million Dollar Extreme
 Olde English
 Second Nature Improv
 Stella
 Smosh
 Studio C
 The Lonely Island
 The Midnight Show
 The Second City
 The State
 The Tenderloins
 The Whitest Kids U' Know
 Under the Gun Theater
 Upright Citizens Brigade

See also
 List of sketch comedy television series

References